The Sacramento Deep Water Ship Channel (also known as Sacramento River Deep Water Ship Channel or SRDWSC) is a canal from the Port of Sacramento in West Sacramento, California, to the Sacramento River, which flows into San Francisco Bay. It was completed by the United States Army Corps of Engineers in 1963.

The Port of Sacramento is a significant port on the West Coast of the United States, but receives far less traffic than larger ports. It handles primarily agricultural products and other bulk goods rather than containers, which dominate the shipping market.

A plan to dredge the channel to  became stalled in 1990 because the Port of Sacramento was unable to finance its share of the cost. However, there is still interest in the project.

The channel has one set of ships locks—the William B. Stone Sacramento Locks—located at the eastern terminus of the channel, where it meets the Sacramento River. These locks were decommissioned in the mid 1980s and de-authorized in 2000. While the locks were reactivated for a fish passage study in 2003 and 2004, they are currently non-operational.

History
The Sacramento Deep Water Ship Channel was authorized by the River and Harbor Act of 24 July 1946. It is a modification of, and a supplement to, the Sacramento River Shallow Draft Navigation Project which was adopted by the River and Harbor Act of 3 March 1899, which was started in September 1899 and completed in 1904. While the Deep Water Ship Channel project was authorized in 1946, with construction started in 1949, it was stopped in 1950 and did not start again till 1956, with ship operation not until June 1963.

The channel is part of the California Green Trade Corridor project, as ships move cargo much greener than trucks and trains . Green Trade Corridor Marine Highway (ports of Oakland-Stockton-West Sacramento) can improve goods movement through Northern California.

Flora and fauna
Sea lions have been spotted at the far eastern terminus of the Sacramento Deep Water Ship Channel, at approximately 38°33'04.3"N 121°34'46.6"W, as have American white pelicans, at approximately 38°33'04.3"N 121°34'46.6"W.

See also
Stockton Deepwater Shipping Channel
California Heartland
City of West Sacramento
United States Army Corps of Engineers
Container on barge

References

 

Canals in California
Sacramento River
Geography of the Sacramento Valley
Bodies of water of Sacramento County, California
Bodies of water of Solano County, California
Bodies of water of Yolo County, California
West Sacramento, California
Transportation buildings and structures in Sacramento County, California
Transportation buildings and structures in Solano County, California
Transportation buildings and structures in Yolo County, California
Economy of Sacramento, California
Canals opened in 1963
1963 establishments in California
Geography of the San Francisco Bay Area